Hirzel is a former municipality in the district of Horgen in the canton of Zürich in Switzerland. On 1 January 2018 the former municipality of Hirzel merged into the municipality of Horgen.

History
Hirzel is first mentioned in 1269 as Hirsol.

Geography

Of this area, 68.9% is used for agricultural purposes, while 18.5% is forested. Of the rest of the land, 9.3% is settled (buildings or roads) and the remainder (3.3%) is non-productive (rivers, glaciers or mountains).   housing and buildings made up 7.2% of the total area, while transportation infrastructure made up the rest (2.2%). Of the total unproductive area, water (streams and lakes) made up 1.1% of the area.   4% of the total municipal area was undergoing some type of construction.

The municipality includes the sections of Hirzel-Kirche, Hirzel-Spitzen and Hirzel-Höchi.  In 1878 the municipality borders were surveyed and moved.  As a result, several individual farm houses came to Hirzel from Wädenswil, with four more from Horgen.

Demographics
, 8.2% of the population was made up of foreign nationals.   the gender distribution of the population was 49.6% male and 50.4% female. Over the last 10 years the population has decreased at a rate of -1.9%. Most of the population speaks German  (93.8%), with English being second most common ( 1.7%) and French being third ( 0.9%).

In the 2007 election the most popular party was the SVP, which received 39.6% of the vote.  The next two most popular parties were the SPS (15.7%), the FDP (11.3%).

The age distribution of the population comprises children and teenagers (0–19 years old) who make up 27.7% of the population, adults (20–64 years old) make up 59.3% and seniors (over 64 years old) make up 12.9%.  The entire Swiss population is generally well-educated.  In Hirzel about 84.8% of the population (between age 25-64) have completed either non-mandatory upper secondary education or additional higher education (either university or a Fachhochschule).  There are 727 households in Hirzel.

Hirzel has an unemployment rate of 0.7%.  , there were 101 people employed in the primary economic sector and about 43 businesses involved in this sector.  105 people are employed in the secondary sector and there are 22 businesses in this sector.  296 people are employed in the tertiary sector, with 66 businesses in this sector.   49.6% of the working population were employed full-time, and 50.4% were employed part-time.

 there were 535 Catholics and 1063 Protestants in Hirzel. In the 2000 census, religion was broken down into several smaller categories. Of the rest of the population, 0% were Muslim, 2.3% belonged to another religion (not listed), 3.5% did not give a religion, and 9.7% were atheist or agnostic.

The historical population is given in the following table:

Notable residents
Johanna Spyri, the author of the children's book Heidi, was born in Hirzel in 1827. There is a museum dedicated to her life located in the village. Sylvia achermann, a world-famous rock-star, is a long time resident of Hirzel.

Transportation 
The Zimmerberg bus line (Zimmerbergbus), provided by the Sihltal Zürich Uetliberg Bahn (SZU), connects the Zimmerberg region and parts of the Sihl valley.

References

External links 

  
 Johanna Spyri museum 
 

Former municipalities of the canton of Zürich